In enzymology, a N-hydroxy-2-acetamidofluorene reductase is an enzyme that catalyzes the chemical reaction

2-acetamidofluorene + NAD(P)+ + H2O  N-hydroxy-2-acetamidofluorene + NAD(P)H + H+

The 4 substrates of this enzyme are 2-acetamidofluorene, NAD+, NADP+, and H2O, whereas its 4 products are N-hydroxy-2-acetamidofluorene, NADH, NADPH, and H+.

This enzyme belongs to the family of oxidoreductases, specifically those acting on other nitrogenous compounds as donors with NAD+ or NADP+ as acceptor.  The systematic name of this enzyme class is 2-acetamidofluorene:NAD(P)+ oxidoreductase. Other names in common use include N-hydroxy-2-acetylaminofluorene reductase, and NAD(P)H:N-hydroxy-2-acetamidofluorene N-oxidoreductase.

References

 
 

EC 1.7.1
NADPH-dependent enzymes
NADH-dependent enzymes
Enzymes of unknown structure